Noam Shuster-Eliassi is an Israeli comedian and activist. She performs in Hebrew, Arabic, and English.

Biography 
Shuster-Eliassi was born to an Iranian-born Jewish mother and a Jerusalem-born father whose parents were Holocaust survivors from Romania. Since she was seven years old, she grew up in Neve Shalom/Wāħat as-Salām ("Oasis of Peace"), a community north of Jerusalem where Jews and Palestinians live together by choice. In this community, she learned Arabic quickly and was often mistaken for an Arab.

Shuster-Eliassi participated in national service instead of serving in the army, then went to study acting at the New York Film Academy for a year. She played a part in Talya Lavie's 2006 short film "The Substitute" before attending Brandeis University on a scholarship. Through an internship with Women's Equity in Access to Care & Treatment (WE ACT), she went to Rwanda to help women get medical treatment.

Shuster-Eliassi became a co-director of Interpeace, an organization founded and later discontinued by the United Nations, when she was in her early 20s.

In 2019, she went to the Harvard Divinity School for a fellowship under the Religion, Conflict, and Peace Initiative, where she was to develop her one-woman show to be performed at various nightclubs in major US cities. However, with the outbreak of the COVID-19 pandemic, she returned to Israel, where she contracted the virus and stayed at a coronavirus hostel in Jerusalem.

She was the subject of the mini documentary Reckoning with Laughter, directed by Amber Fares and produced by Al Jazeera.

"Dubai, Dubai" 
Shuster-Eliassi had a viral moment in Arab media January 2022 in response to her performance of a satirical song called "Dubai, Dubai" in perfect Arabic on the program "Shu Esmo" on the Arabic Israeli station Makan 33. Performing as "Haifa Wannabe" (playing on the name of the Arab pop star Haifa Wehbe), she delivered searing punchlines satirizing the Abraham Accords and the Emirates' normalization of relations with Israel and mocking the hypocrisy of Israel's relations with Arab countries. The song was written by the program's editor, Razi Najjar.

Awards 
In 2018, Shuster-Eliassi was named "Best New Jewish Comedian of the Year" in a competition sponsored by JW3, also known as Jewish Community Centre in London.

References 

Living people
Israeli female comedians
Israeli activists
Year of birth missing (living people)